Sunningdale is a large village with a retail area and a civil parish in the Royal Borough of Windsor and Maidenhead. It takes up the extreme south-east corner of Berkshire, England.  It has a railway station on the (London) Waterloo to Reading Line and is adjoined by green buffers including Sunningdale Golf Club and Wentworth Golf Club. Its northern peripheral estates adjoin Virginia Water Lake.

Location
Sunningdale adjoins Surrey, and lies across Sunninghill (from which it takes its name) from Ascot. It is south of Virginia Water Lake. The nearest major towns are spread 5.5 to 6.5 miles away: Bracknell, Camberley, Staines upon Thames and Woking. It is connected to two of these by the A30 old trunk road, via which Camberley benefits from a flyover over the main intersecting road (the A322) at Bagshot. Sunningdale has a railway station on the Waterloo to Reading line. The A30, here bypassed by the M3 motorway a few miles distant, has one level crossing which in the 19th century was built near to the middle of the settlement.

History
The present-day civil parish of Sunningdale came into existence in 1894 under the provisions of the Local Government Act 1894; the village had previously been part of Old Windsor. It was, until 1995, partly in Berkshire and partly in Surrey. The Surrey area of the village, known as Broomhall, was also split between the boroughs of Surrey Heath and Runnymede. This original arrangement caused problems and was resolved after much consultation locally between the two county councils, three borough councils and four parish councils. As a result, its former Surrey neighbourhoods merged with the rest in the Royal Borough of Windsor and Maidenhead, in the Royal County of Berkshire (which became a non-administrative county in 1995). The area is popular with professional golfers due to its adjoining green buffers including Sunningdale Golf Club and Wentworth Golf Club.

Mansions

Charters
Charters is a Grade II-listed art deco mansion, built in 1938 for the industrialist Frank Parkinson by the architects Adie, Button and Partners. It was built on the site of an earlier country house built in the late 1860s by William Terrick Hamilton. Parkinson's guests included Winston Churchill and the Duke and Duchess of Windsor. In 1949, the house was bought by Sir Montague Burton. It later became a corporate headquarters and has since been redeveloped as an apartment complex and spa.

Coworth House

Now the Coworth Park Hotel, this is a late 18th-century country house which was the home of Edward Stanley, 17th Earl of Derby, the early 20th-century Secretary of State for War and British Ambassador to France.

Sunningdale Park

The Sunningdale Agreement was signed at Sunningdale Park, at the Civil Service Staff College (now the National School of Government) on 9 December 1973, a precursor of the Northern Ireland peace process.

Notable residents

 Richard Beckinsale
Brian Blessed
 Agatha Christie
 Darren Clarke
 Junior Campbell
Diana Dors
Emma Forbes
Anna Friel
 Philip Hanson
Chesney Hawkes
 Joseph Dalton Hooker
Gary Lineker
 Paul McGinley
Nanette Newman
Billy Ocean
Marcus Österdahl
Cliff Richard
Five Star
David Thewlis

References

External links 
 Sunningdale Parish Council website

Villages in Berkshire
Royal Borough of Windsor and Maidenhead
Civil parishes in Berkshire